John Michael Bishop (born February 22, 1936) is an American immunologist and microbiologist who shared the 1989 Nobel Prize in Physiology or Medicine with Harold E. Varmus and was co-winner of 1984 Alfred P. Sloan Prize. He serves as an active faculty member at the University of California, San Francisco (UCSF), where he also served as chancellor from 1998 to 2009.

Education and early life 
Bishop was born in York, Pennsylvania. He attended Gettysburg College as an undergraduate, where he was a brother of the Theta-Pi Zeta chapter of Lambda Chi Alpha fraternity. He later attended Harvard University Medical School, where he earned an MD in 1962.

Career
Bishop began his career working for the National Institute of Allergy and Infectious Diseases, a part of the National Institutes of Health.  He then spent a year working for the Heinrich Pette Institute in Hamburg, Germany before joining the faculty of the University of California, San Francisco in 1968. Bishop has remained on the school's faculty since 1968, and was chancellor of the university from 1998 to 2009. He is director of the Bishop Lab.

He became the eighth chancellor of UCSF in 1998. He oversaw one of UCSF's major transition and growth periods, including the expanding Mission Bay development and philanthropic support recruitment. During his tenure, he unveiled the first comprehensive, campus-wide, strategic plan to promote diversity and foster a supportive work environment. During this time, UCSF also adopted a new mission: advancing health worldwide™.

Research
Much of this work was conducted jointly with Harold Varmus in a notably long scientific partnership. Their best-known accomplishment was the identification of a cellular gene (c-src) that gave rise to the v-src oncogene of Rous Sarcoma Virus, a cancer-causing virus first isolated from a chicken sarcoma by Peyton Rous in 1910.  Their discovery triggered the identification of many other cellular proto-oncogenes—progenitors of viral oncogenes and targets for mutations that drive human cancers.

Awards and honors
Bishop is best known for his Nobel-winning work on retroviral oncogenes.  Working with Harold E. Varmus in the 1980s, he discovered the first human oncogene, c-Src.  Their findings allowed the understanding of how malignant tumors are formed from changes to the normal genes of a cell.  These changes can be produced by viruses, by radiation, or by exposure to some chemicals.

Bishop is a member of the National Academy of Sciences, the American Academy of Arts and Sciences, and the American Philosophical Society.

Bishop is also a recipient of National Medal of Science in 2003. That same year, his book  "How to win the Nobel Prize: An Unexpected Life in Science" was published. He was elected Foreign Member of the Royal Society (ForMemRS) in 2008.
In 2020, Bishop received from the UC Berkeley Academic Senate the Clark Kerr Award for distinguished leadership in higher education.

Archival collections
The University of California, San Francisco Archives and Special Collections houses a collection of J. Michael Bishop papers, including his laboratory research notebooks, writings, photographs, and other material.

References

External links
 

21st-century American biologists
Members of the United States National Academy of Sciences
American immunologists
American microbiologists
American Nobel laureates
American virologists
Gettysburg College alumni
Harvard Medical School alumni
Nobel laureates in Physiology or Medicine
National Medal of Science laureates
University of California, San Francisco faculty
1936 births
Living people
People from York, Pennsylvania
Foreign Members of the Royal Society
Recipients of the Albert Lasker Award for Basic Medical Research
Members of the American Philosophical Society
Members of the National Academy of Medicine